Ebullism is the formation of gas bubbles in bodily fluids due to reduced environmental pressure, for example at high altitude.  It occurs because a system of liquid and gas at equilibrium will see a net conversion of liquid to gas as pressure lowers; for example, liquids reach their boiling point at lower temperatures when the pressure on them is lowered.

Symptoms
Symptoms of ebullism include bubbles in the membranes of the mouth and eyes, swelling of the skin, and bubbles in the blood. Blood circulation and breathing may be impaired or stopped. The brain tissue may be starved of oxygen because of blockage of arteries, and the lungs may swell and hemorrhage. Death results unless recompression is rapid enough to reduce the bubbles before tissue damage occurs.

In 1960, Joseph Kittinger experienced localised ebullism during a  ascent in a helium-driven gondola. His right-hand glove failed to pressurise and his hand expanded to roughly twice its normal volume  accompanied by disabling pain. His hand took about three hours to recover after his return to the ground.

Tissue samples from the remains of the crew of Space Shuttle STS-107 Columbia revealed evidence of ebullism. Given the level of tissue damage, the crew could not have regained consciousness even with re-pressurization.

Mechanism
This altitude is known as Armstrong's Line. In practice bodily fluids do not boil off at this altitude. This is because the skin and outer organs have enough strength to withstand this pressure, thus pressure inside the body would be significantly higher—however, nitrogen bubbles are starting to form, creating a hazard.

Prevention
To prevent ebullism, a pure oxygen (O2) atmosphere was used in early space flights to eliminate nitrogen in the blood. There are major fire hazards associated with using pure O2 as a breathing gas, which was central to the death of three astronauts in a fire during a ground test with Apollo 1. Nonetheless, NASA continued to use a nominally pure oxygen atmosphere throughout the Apollo Program but switched to air for the follow-on Space Transport System "Space Shuttle". Russian cosmonauts used pure oxygen before changing to a higher-pressure nitrox mixture, leading to incompatibility problems in 1975 on the Apollo-Soyuz Test Project. Space suits are often pressurized to several psi lower than stations' capsules or shuttles and since they still use pure O2, an acclimation period is common in the airlock to remove nitrogen and other gases from the bloodstream.

Etymology
The term "space ebullism" was introduced by Captain Julian E. Ward in his paper "The True Nature of the Boiling of Body Fluids in Space", published in Aviation Medicine in October 1956.  It was suggested "because the word ebullism does not connote the addition of heat to produce vapor." It comes from Latin ebullire, meaning "to bubble out, or to boil up."

See also

References 

Medical terminology
Space medicine